The Royal Cornwall Hospital, formerly and still commonly known as the Treliske Hospital, is a medium-sized teaching hospital in Treliske, on the outskirts of Truro, Cornwall, England. The hospital provides training services for the University of Exeter Medical School. It is managed by the Royal Cornwall Hospitals NHS Trust.

History
The new hospital at Treliske, which initially included 180 beds and six wards, was opened by Princess Alexandra on 12 July 1968. Services were transferred from the Royal Cornwall Infirmary to the Royal Cornwall Hospital in the mid-1990s.

The Trelawny Wing, named after Sir Jonathan Trelawny, was built at a cost of £27million and officially opened in 1998. The work, which took six years of planning and development, marked the completion of the conversion of the Royal Cornwall Hospital into the main district general hospital for Cornwall. The wing ensured facilities in Cornwall were equal to those found in any of the other district general hospitals in the country.

David Cameron's younger daughter was born in the Princess Alexandra Maternity Unit, named after the princess who opened the hospital, while Cameron and his wife Samantha were on holiday in Cornwall in August 2010.

See also

Healthcare in Cornwall
List of hospitals in England

References

External links 
 
 Royal Cornwall Hospital on the NHS website
 Inspection reports from the Care Quality Commission

Hospital buildings completed in 1968
NHS hospitals in England
Teaching hospitals in England
Hospitals in Cornwall
Truro